Chlamydastis xylinaspis is a moth in the family Depressariidae. It was described by Edward Meyrick in 1915. It is found in Peru.

The wingspan is about 16 mm. The forewings are ochreous-grey, suffused with whitish on the costal half of the median third and a black dot beneath the middle of the wing. There is an inwardly oblique raised black bar on the end of the cell, partially edged with brown. There is also a large rounded rufous-brown apical blotch suffusedly streaked with black, its edge running from the costal prominence to below the middle of the termen. The hindwings are dark grey.

References

Moths described in 1915
Chlamydastis